Rabid is a 1977 independent body horror film written and directed by David Cronenberg. An international co-production of Canada and the United States, the film stars Marilyn Chambers in the lead role, supported by Frank Moore, Joe Silver, and Howard Ryshpan. Chambers plays a woman who, after being injured in a motorcycle accident and undergoing a surgical operation, develops an orifice under one of her armpits that hides a phallic/clitoral stinger she uses to feed on people's blood. Those she bites become infected, and then feed upon others, spreading the disease exponentially. The result is massive chaos, starting in the Quebec countryside, and ending up in Montreal. Rabid made $1 million in Canada, making it one of the highest-grossing Canadian films of all time. A remake of the same name, directed by Jen and Sylvia Soska, was released in 2019.

Plot
Rose and her boyfriend Hart get into a motorcycle accident in the Quebec countryside, caused by a van parked in the middle of the road. While Hart suffers a broken hand, a separated shoulder and a concussion, Rose is severely injured and burned by the incident. They are both transported to the nearby Keloid Clinic for Plastic Surgery, where head doctor Dan Keloid decides to perform a radical new procedure on Rose. He uses morphogenetically neutral grafts to her chest and abdomen in the hope that it will differentiate and replace the damaged skin and organs. One month later, Hart is released while Rose remains in a coma.

Rose abruptly awakens from her coma screaming, prompting patient Lloyd Walsh to calm her down and hold her hand, but she pierces his skin as she holds him. When asked, Lloyd cannot remember anything afterwards and the doctor does not know what caused the injury on his right arm; it is only known that his blood is not clotting from the wound and he cannot feel anything on his right side. While Keloid transfers him to Montreal General Hospital for further evaluation, his experimental procedures on Rose have caused a mutation in her body that made her able to only subsist on human blood. A new organ resembling a red stinger emerges from a small orifice below Rose's armpit; it pierces her victims and draws their blood. One night, Rose leaves the clinic to feed upon a nearby cow's blood, which makes her vomit. A drunken farmer tries to attack her, but she pierces and feeds on him before calling Hart to pick her up.

The next day, the farmer turns into a pale zombie-like monster and attacks a waitress at a nearby diner. Lloyd discharges himself from the clinic. While taking a taxi to the airport, he begins foaming at the mouth and attacks the driver. The car crashes into the freeway before a nearby truck kills them both. At the clinic, Keloid is infected by Rose's stinger and attacks from within, which causes panic. During this time, Rose escapes from the hospital despite calling Hart to come to her aid, and hitchhikes rides from various people to Montreal. She infects one of the truck drivers, causing the driver to attack his colleague. Hart and Keloid's business partner, Murray Cypher, while searching for Rose, meet up with police chief Claude LePointe and public health officials in talks about an upcoming epidemic. During this time, Hart witnesses an officer become infected before being shot by uninfected police officers. He calls Rose's friend Mindy and asks her to keep Rose in her apartment if she appears until he can come over. Rose arrives in the city and stays in Mindy's apartment.

While Mindy watches a television broadcast detailing a new strain of rabies now all over Montreal, Rose goes to a sex cinema and infects a leering patron. Mindy notices an infected woman while riding the subway and attempts to avoid eye-contact. The rabid woman attacks a nearby passenger by biting off part of his ear in a bloody frenzy, culminating in a panic of fleeing passengers. LePointe, while riding a limousine with local health officials, is attacked by two infected crewmen who use a jackhammer through the vehicle door and drag the driver out to feed on him. The other official and LePointe, forced to leave their driver behind, escape by driving in reverse. With the infection becoming worse in the city, and the standard rabies treatment having no effect, Dr. Royce Gentry advises a shoot-to-kill policy to prevent future infections. As Christmas approaches, martial law is declared within Montreal, and the doctor works on developing a cure. The Canadian Army sets up road blocks to check for infected people, and a convoy of NBC-suited soldiers ride into the city to assist the authorities with body disposal.

Murray and Hart arrive at the former's home and as Hart drives away in Murray's car, Murray calls for his wife, but there is no answer. Murray wanders into his baby's nursery where he finds what is left of his baby and is attacked by his infected wife. Hart goes into the deserted city to search for Rose. An infected civilian jumps onto Hart's car before being shot, and the bio-warfare suited soldiers spray disinfectant on his car before permitting him to continue driving.

Mindy watches a report which says that a possible carrier of the infection may be immune and has been traced back to the Keloid Clinic. Rose walks into the room and feeds on Mindy. Hart finds Rose in the act and tries to reason with her about treatment, but she refuses to believe him and is in denial that she is responsible for the epidemic that has now claimed many people. He chases her in the apartment, but he is rendered unconscious and she infects a man waiting in the apartment lobby. When Hart awakens, Rose brings the newly infected man to his apartment and locks herself inside the room before calling Hart about her plan; she wants to test Hart's accusation and see if the man turns infected or not. While Hart frantically tells her to leave the apartment and hopelessly sits at the receiver, the infected man awakens and attacks Rose. The next morning, Rose's corpse is found by NBC-suited soldiers in an alleyway and they dump her in a garbage truck.

Cast

Production
The film, originally titled Mosquitoes, was financed by the Canadian Film Development Corporation. The Crown corporation did not associate itself with the production publicly, however, due to controversy over Cronenberg's previous movie Shivers. According to Cronenberg, at the time, the only CFDC films that had turned a profit were the two that he had made for the corporation, Shivers and Crimes of the Future.

Cronenberg wanted to cast Sissy Spacek as the lead, but the producers rejected her, because of her freckles and Texas accent. Spacek would star in the hit film Carrie; Cronenberg included a poster for that movie in the background of a scene in Rabid. 

According to Cronenberg, executive producer Ivan Reitman had heard that Chambers was looking for a mainstream role, and suggested casting her as Rose, believing that it would make the film more marketable overseas. Cronenberg agreed to cast her, even though he had not seen her best-known movie, Behind the Green Door. Cronenberg would later say that he had been impressed by Chambers and her work ethic during the filming of Rabid. 

The film was shot in Montreal.

Release
Rabid opened in Montreal in June 1977. It was released theatrically in the United States by New World Pictures in 1977.

Box office
Rabid grossed $100,000 in the first ten days after opening in Montreal. The film was one of the highest-grossing Canadian films of all time, making $1 million in Canada.

Critical reception

Variety called Rabid "an extremely violent, sometimes nauseating, picture". Les Wedman of the Vancouver Sun  described the movie's story as "dreadful" and criticized the film for "relying heavily on shocking special effects" as opposed to suspense. He opined that, with the exception of Joe Silver, "there isn't a decent performance in the movie."

Conversely, Time Out called the film "far better staged" than Shivers, and concluded, "None of the other recent apocalypse movies has shown so much political or cinematic sophistication."

Rotten Tomatoes, a review aggregator, reports that 77% of 26 surveyed critics gave the film a positive review; the average rating is 6.3/10.

Home media
Warner Home Video released Rabid on VHS in 1983. In 2000, it was released on DVD by New Concorde Home Entertainment. E1 Entertainment put out a Special Edition DVD in 2004. The film was rereleased on DVD and Blu-ray for Region B by Arrow Video on February 16, 2015. Scream Factory released the movie on Blu-ray on November 22, 2016.

Remake

A remake of the film, directed by Jen and Sylvia Soska and starring Laura Vandervoort as Rose, was released on December 13, 2019.

Related works
A novelization by Richard Lewis was published in 1978.  Faber and Faber released the screenplay in 2002 in a collection of the scripts for Cronenberg's first four feature films.

References

Bibliography

External links
 Rabid info, trivia and photos
 
 
 
 

1977 films
1977 horror films
1977 independent films
1970s science fiction horror films
American body horror films
American independent films
American science fiction horror films
American vampire films
American zombie films
Canadian body horror films
Canadian independent films
Canadian science fiction horror films
Canadian vampire films
Canadian zombie films
English-language Canadian films
Films about viral outbreaks
Films directed by David Cronenberg
Films produced by John Dunning
Films set in Montreal
Films shot in Montreal
New World Pictures films
Works about plastic surgery
Films set in a movie theatre
Films set in Quebec
Films set in hospitals
Canadian Armed Forces in films
1970s English-language films
1970s American films
1970s Canadian films